Percival Edward George (1 July 1890 – 28 March 1983) was a Canadian politician and mayor of Victoria, British Columbia from 1944 to 1951.

George was born in  Finchley, London, in 1890. During the First World War, he served in Princess Mary's Canadian Scottish Regiment and the Canadian Overseas Expeditionary Force.

References

Mayors of Victoria, British Columbia
1890s births
1983 deaths
People from Finchley
British emigrants to Canada
Canadian military personnel of World War I